A system programming language is a programming language used for system programming; such languages are designed for writing system software, which usually requires different development approaches when compared with application software. Edsger Dijkstra refers to these languages as machine oriented high order languages, or mohol.

General-purpose programming languages tend to focus on generic features to allow programs written in the language to use the same code on different platforms. Examples of such languages include ALGOL and Pascal. This generic quality typically comes at the cost of denying direct access to the machine's internal workings, and this often has negative effects on performance.

System languages, in contrast, are designed not for compatibility, but for performance and ease of access to the underlying hardware while still providing high-level programming concepts like structured programming. Examples include SPL and ESPOL, both of which are similar to ALGOL in syntax but tuned to their respective platforms. Others are cross-platform but designed to work close to the hardware, like BLISS, JOVIAL and BCPL.

Some languages straddle the system and application domains, bridging the gap between these uses. The canonical example is C, which is used widely for both system and application programming. Some modern languages also do this such as Rust and Swift.

Features 
In contrast with application languages, system programming languages typically offer more-direct access to the physical hardware of the machine: an archetypical system programming language in this sense was BCPL. System programming languages often lack built-in input/output (I/O) facilities because a system-software project usually develops its own I/O mechanisms or builds on basic monitor I/O or screen management facilities. The distinction between languages used for system programming and application programming became blurred over time with the widespread popularity of PL/I, C and Pascal.

History 
The earliest system software was written in assembly language primarily because there was no alternative, but also for reasons including efficiency of object code, compilation time, and ease of debugging. Application languages such as FORTRAN were used for system programming, although they usually still required some routines to be written in assembly language.

Mid-level languages
Mid-level languages "have much of the syntax and facilities of a higher level language, but also provide direct access in the language (as well as providing assembly language) to machine features." The earliest of these was ESPOL on Burroughs mainframes in about 1960, followed by Niklaus Wirth's PL360 (first written on a Burroughs system as a cross compiler), which had the general syntax of ALGOL 60 but whose statements directly manipulated CPU registers and memory. Other languages in this category include MOL-360 and PL/S.

As an example, a typical PL360 statement is R9 := R8 and R7 shll 8 or R6, signifying that registers 8 and 7 should be and'ed together, the result shifted left 8 bits, the result of that or'ed with the contents of register 6, and the final result placed into register 9.

Higher-level languages
While PL360 is at the semantic level of assembly language, another kind of system programming language operates at a higher semantic level, but has specific extensions designed to make the language suitable for system programming. An early example of this kind of language is LRLTRAN, which extended Fortran with features for character and bit manipulation, pointers, and directly addressed jump tables.

Subsequently, languages such as C were developed, where the combination of features was sufficient to write system software, and a compiler could be developed that generated efficient object programs on modest hardware. Such a language generally omits features that cannot be implemented efficiently, and adds a small number of machine-dependent features needed to access specific hardware abilities; inline assembly code, such as C's  statement, is often used for this purpose. Although many such languages were developed, C and C++ are the ones which survived.

System Programming Language (SPL) is also the name of a specific language on the HP 3000 computer series, used for its operating system HP Multi-Programming Executive (MPE), and other parts of its system software.

Major languages

See also 

 Ousterhout's dichotomy
 PreScheme

Notes

References

External links 
 
 System Programming Languages

Programming language topics
System software
Systems programming languages